Turners Cross may mean:

 Turners Cross (stadium), a football (soccer) ground in Cork, Ireland
 Turners Cross, Cork, a residential district and parish in Cork, Ireland